Stereopathetic Soulmanure is the second studio album by American musician Beck. It was released on February 22, 1994, by Flipside. The album shows a strong folk influence, consisting of home recordings, studio recordings, live performances, field recordings, sound collages, and abstract noise experiments.

A lo-fi recording of largely anti-commercial nature, Stereopathetic Soulmanure is Beck's third official recording, the first two being Golden Feelings and A Western Harvest Field by Moonlight. Beck would soon return with the mostly acoustic One Foot in the Grave and Mellow Gold before recording his major label follow-up Odelay (1996).

As of July 2008, Stereopathetic Soulmanure has sold over 146,000 copies in the United States.

On January 30, 2023, nearly 29 years after the album's release, Stereopathetic Soulmanure was officially released on digital storefronts and streaming services.

Track listing
All songs were written by Beck, except "Waitin' for a Train", written by Jimmie Rodgers.

Notes
 "Bonus Noise" is included on most discs, but not all.

Rerelease track listing
There was a rerelease of the album by Revolver USA on September 25, 2000. This pressing separates "No Money No Honey" over tracks 7 and 8 and breaks parts of "One Foot in the Grave" and "Aphid Manure Heist" over tracks 12, 13 and 14; this caused all tracks after "Crystal Clear (Beer)" to be off from the track listing on the back cover. This pressing also omits the short snippet of dialog called "Ken", yet keeps "Bonus Noise" on the same track as "Modesto".  This pressing causes some online track listings, such as the one at Allmusic, to be incorrect. The actual track listing of this pressing is as follows:

 "Pink Noise (Rock Me Amadeus)" – 2:57
 "Rowboat" – 3:45
 "Thunder Peel" – 1:48
 "Waitin' for a Train" – 1:08
 "The Spirit Moves Me" – 2:10
 "Crystal Clear (Beer)" – 2:29
 "Noise 1" (start of "No Money No Honey") – 0:05
 "No Money No Honey" – 2:07
 "8.6.82" – 0:37
 "Total Soul Future (Eat It)" – 1:48
 "One Foot in the Grave" – 1:57
 "Noise 2" (end of "One Foot in the Grave") – 0:17
 "Noise 3" (start of "Aphid Manure Heist") – 0:31
 "Aphid Manure Heist" – 0:57
 "Today Has Been a Fucked Up Day" – 2:34
 " "Rollins Power Sauce" " – 1:54
 "Puttin' It Down" – 2:23
 "11.6.45" – 0:30
 "Cut 1/2 Blues" – 2:37
 "Jagermeister Pie" – 1:07
 "Ozzy" – 2:05
 "Dead Wild Cat" – 0:25
 "Satan Gave Me a Taco" – 3:46
 "8.4.82" – 0:26
 "Tasergun" – 3:51
 "Modesto" (includes "Bonus Noise", but not "Ken") – 20:07

This release can be differentiated from the original 1994 Flipside release in two ways. The rereleased CD has "FLIP660" printed on the CD whereas the original would have "FLIP60". The CD case however still retains the original catalog number on the spines "FLIP60". And there is a message above the barcode on the back of the CD case that reads "Distributed by Revolver USA www.midheaven.com/fi/".

Personnel
 Beck – vocals, guitars, bass, keyboard, banjo, composer, sound effects
 Rachel – drums
 Leo LeBlanc – pedal steel
 Bobby Hecksher – guitar
 Rusty Cusak – engineer
 Gibran Evans – design
 Tom Grimley – engineer

Notes
"Bonus Noise" contains a reversed song called "In the Clover".
The techno introduction to "No Money No Honey" is a lo-fi sample of the song "Hall of Mirrors" by B12, found on their album Electro-Soma.
The introduction to "Today Has Been a Fucked Up Day" is a lo-fi sample of the song "Olivine" by Close Up Over (from the Black Dog Productions album Bytes.)
The track "Waitin' for a Train" is a cover of a Jimmie Rodgers song. It opens with a soundbite (spoken by Ross Harris) from Steve Hanft's film Normal. Hanft and Harris are both longtime friends and collaborators of Beck.
The track "Thunder Peel" was re-recorded during the Odelay-era, with the new version appearing on the Japanese edition of "The New Pollution" single and later appearing (in mono, with the original recording being in stereo) on the deluxe version of that album.
Johnny Cash covered the song "Rowboat" on his 1996 album Unchained.

References

External links

Beck albums
1994 albums
Albums produced by Beck